Molière is a 2007 film by the French director Laurent Tirard and starring Romain Duris as Molière. It was released in Europe in January 2007 and in the United States in July 2007. It was entered into the 29th Moscow International Film Festival where Fabrice Luchini won the Silver George for Best Actor. The screenplay was co-written by Tirard and Grégoire Vigneron.

Plot
The film begins in 1658, when the French actor and playwright returns to Paris with his theatrical troupe to perform in the theatre that the king's brother has given him. Most of the film is in the form of a flashback to 1645.  Following an unsuccessful run as a tragic actor, Molière is released from debtor's prison by Monsieur Jourdain, a wealthy commoner with social pretensions, who agrees to pay the young actor's debts if Molière teaches him to act.

Jourdain, a married man with two daughters, hopes to use this talent to ingratiate himself with Célimène, a recently widowed aristocrat with whom he has become obsessed. He hopes to perform a short play he has written for the occasion. Molière, however, has been presented to the family and staff of Monsieur Jourdain as Tartuffe, a priest who is to serve as tutor for the Jourdains' younger daughter. As the story progresses Molière proceeds to fall in love with Jourdain's neglected wife, Elmire.  Sub-plots involve the love life of the Jourdains' older daughter, and the intrigues of the penniless and cynical aristocrat Dorante at the expense of the gullible Jourdain.

The story is mostly fictional and many scenes follow actual scenes and text in Molière's plays including Tartuffe, Le Misanthrope, Le Malade imaginaire and Le Bourgeois gentilhomme, whose principal character is also named Jourdain. It is implied that these "actual" events in his life inspired the plays of his maturity.

Cast
 Romain Duris as Jean-Baptiste Poquelin
 Fabrice Luchini as M. Jourdain
 Laura Morante as Elmire Jourdain
 Edouard Baer as Dorante
 Ludivine Sagnier as Célimène
 Fanny Valette as Henriette Jourdain
 Gonzague Montuel as Valère
 Gilian Petrovski as Thomas
 Sophie-Charlotte Husson as Madeleine Béjart
 François Civil as Louis Béjart
 Anne Suarez as Catherine de Brie
 Annelise Hesme as Marquise du Parc
 Nicolas Vaude as Monsieur

Critical reception
The film holds a "certified fresh" rating of 70% on review aggregator website Rotten Tomatoes, based on 86 reviews, with a rating average of 6.4 out of 10. The site's consensus reads, "Molière is a sophisticated, witty biopic of the great satirist."

References

External links
 

2007 films
2000s biographical films
2000s historical comedy films
French historical comedy films
French biographical films
2000s French-language films
Cultural depictions of Molière
Biographical films about writers
Films about playwrights
Films set in the 17th century
Films directed by Laurent Tirard
2007 comedy films
2000s French films